Null Device  is an electronic band from Wisconsin, USA.

Band History

Founded in 1995 by students at the University of Wisconsin, Null Device initially focused on instrumental electronic music before transitioning to more traditional synthpop.  After a series of independently-released demos, they were signed to Nilaihah Records in 2002, and released several subsequent albums via that label.  In that time they incorporated influences of Arabic and Indian traditional instrumentation.

After the dissolution of the label, they went on to release two more records independently, before signing to Distortion Productions.

Members

Current
 Eric Oehler - Vocals, Violin, Synthesizer, Percussion, Bass, Songwriting
 Eric Goedken - Lyrics, Production
 Jill Sheridan - Keyboards, Songwriting, Vocals, Production
 Kendra Kreutz - Cello

Former
 Elizabeth Scheef - Dumbek, Frame drum
 Dan Clark - Guitar
 Charles "Chuck4" McKenzie - Bass
 Tom Lawrence - Synthesizer
 William Annis - Synthesizer

Discography

Albums
 1999 - The Year in Pixels
 2002 - Sublimation
 2004 - A Million Different Moments
 2007 - Excursions
 2010 - Suspending Belief
 2013 - While You Were Otherwise Engaged
 2016 - Perihelion
 2019 - Line Of Sight
 2022 - The Emerald Age

EPs and Singles
 2000 - Crimson
 2000 - Submariner/Love Stain (Split EP with Polymorphous Perverse)
 2001 - Subliminal
 2003 - Footfalls (EP)
 2005 - The London (EP)
 2009 - Recursions
 2010 - Fading Belief w/ The Dark Clan
 2011 - Something More Exciting Than A Tornado (Live)
 2011 - Misadventures in Dub
 2014 - Night Owl
 2014 - Aphelion
 2015 - Wardrobe
 2016 - What's On Your Mind
 2017 - All You Fascists Bound To Lose
 2018 - Only You
 2021 - Red Right Hand
 2021 - Run/Let You In
 2022 - Flags

References

External links
Official Site
Music Site
Nilaihah Records

Musical groups from Wisconsin
Electronic music groups from Wisconsin
Musical groups established in 1995